WCN may represent:

 Westminster Cable Network, television station of Westminster College
 Wildlife Conservation Network, a non-profit wildlife conservation organization
 Wimco Nagar railway station, Chennai, Tamil Nadu, India (Indian Railways station code)
 Windows Connect Now, a Microsoft scheme for configuring wireless routers
 Wireless community network, a community wireless network project for Chicago, USA
 World Carfree Network, an international network of car-free advocates
 World Chess Network, formerly a commercial Internet site on which to play chess
 World Classical Network, a satellite service in Massachusetts, USA
 World Congress of Neurology, annual meeting of the World Federation of Neurology